The Digital Entertainment Content Ecosystem (DECE, LLC.) was a consortium of major film studios, consumer electronics manufacturers and retailers, networking hardware vendors, systems integrators, and Digital Rights Management (DRM) vendors listed below. The consortium was announced in September 2008 by its president, Mitch Singer, who was also the chief technology officer (CTO) of Sony Pictures Entertainment at the time. DECE was chartered to develop a set of standards for the digital distribution of premium Hollywood content. The consortium created a set of rules and a back-end system for the management of those rules that enabled consumers to share purchased digital content among a domain of registered consumer electronics devices.

DECE's digital locker system was named UltraViolet.

Amazon, Apple, Disney, and Google were not members of DECE. In February 2014, Disney launched its own digital locker system named Keychest and an associated streaming platform named Disney Movies Anywhere. In October 2017, Disney expanded Keychest to outside studios and renamed Disney Movies Anywhere to Movies Anywhere. Movies Anywhere currently connects to Amazon Video, FandangoNOW, Google Play/YouTube, Apple TV/iTunes, Microsoft Movies & TV, Vudu, Verizon Fios, and Xfinity.

On January 30, 2019, after servicing more than 30 million users with over 300 million pieces of TV and movie content, Variety reported the closure of the UltraViolet system on July 31, 2019; DECE recommended confirming connections of UltraViolet content to Vudu and FandangoNow in the US and connections to Flixster outside the US before the service's closure to maintain existing digital rights.  DECE, LLC as an entity officially dissolved in August 2020.

Members 
DECE members included:

Adobe Systems
Akamai Technologies
Alcatel Lucent
Arxan Technologies
Best Buy
BluFocus Inc.
British Sky Broadcasting
British Telecom
castLabs
Catch Media
Cineplex Entertainment
CinemaNow
Cisco
Comcast (Including NBCUniversal)
Cox Communications
CSG Systems' Content Direct
Deluxe Digital
Dolby Laboratories
DTS (sound system)
FandangoNOW
FilmFlex
Fox Entertainment Group
Fujitsu
Hewlett Packard
Huawei Technologies
IBM
Intel
Kaleidescape
Lionsgate
Motorola Mobility
Nagravision
NDS Group
NeuMovie
Neustar
Nokia
PacketVideo
Panasonic
Paramount Pictures
Royal Philips Electronics
QuickPlay Media
RIAA
Red Bee Media
Rovi Corporation
Saffron Digital
Samsung Electronics
SeaChange International
Secure Path Technology
Sonic Solutions
Sony Corporation
Switch Communications
TalkTalk
Technicolor
Testronic Labs
Toggle
Toshiba
Verance
Verimatrix
VeriSign Inc.
Verizon Communications, Inc.
Vubiquity
Vudu
Warner Bros. Entertainment
Widevine Technologies

References 

Technology consortia
Digital rights management